Parit Yaani（Jawi: ڤاريت ياءاني; ）is a small town in Batu Pahat District, Johor, Malaysia. It is located within the parliamentary constituency of Sri Gading.

See also
Parit Andin

References

Towns in Johor
Batu Pahat District